The Vanishing Triangle is an upcoming Irish six-part television series created by Ivan Kavanagh. It is a dramatisation of true stories from Ireland's Vanishing Triangle. Distributed by Eccho Rights, it will air on Virgin Media One in Ireland, SundanceNow in the United States, and Acorn TV in the United Kingdom.

Cast
 India Mullen as Lisa Wallace, investigative journalist
 Allen Leech as David Burke, detective
 Adam Richardson as Tommy Stephens
 Sarah Carroll as Mary Burkely
 Fionnaula Murphy
 Philip O'Sullivan
 Maura Foley
 Kiera Crawford as Rachel Burke
 Jana Mohieden
 Peter Corboy
 Laoise Sweeney
 Carolyn Donnelly
 Stephen Hogan
 Jason Daly
 Brian Moore
 Ella Cannon
 Claire O'Donovan
 Hannah O'Brien
 Shane G. Casey

Production

Development
The Vanishing Triangle was originally developed by Park Films and Screen Ireland. 87 Films and Paper Planes Productions boarded the project as it was commissioned by Virgin Media One and SundanceNow. The series is created by Ivan Kavanagh, and co-written with Sally Tatchell and Rachel Anthony. Executive producers include actor Allen Leech, AnneMarie Naughton and Ana Habajec of Park Films, Patrick Irwin of 87 Films, Alon Aranya of Paper Plane Productions, and Adam Barth and Lucy Robert of Eccho Rights.

Casting
In September 2022, it was announced Allen Leech and India Mullen would lead the series. Maura Foley and Kiera Crawford also joined the cast.

Filming
Filming was reported in Bray, County Wicklow in October 2022.

References

External links
 

Upcoming drama television series
2020s Irish television series
Acorn TV original programming
Sundance TV original programming
Television series based on actual events
Television series set in the 1990s
True crime television series
Virgin Media Television (Ireland) original programming